Stormin' Norman is a rhyming nickname frequently used for anyone named Norman who is also seen as a dynamic or forceful personality. The name is usually a media tag. Here are a few examples of public figures with that tag:

 Norm Sloan (1926–2003), American college basketball coach
 Norm Ellenberger (1932-2015), American college basketball coach
 Norm Cash (1934–1986), major league baseball player
 Norman Schwarzkopf, Jr. (1934–2012), American military figure
 Norm Stewart (born 1935), American college basketball coach (University of Missouri)
 Norman Siegel (born 1943), American civil rights attorney
 Norman Moore (born 1945), State President Liberal Party of Australia  (WA Division)
 Norm Van Lier (1947–2009), American basketball player
 Norm Nixon (born 1955), American retired professional basketball player for the NBA

 Norman Whiteside (born 1965), Northern Irish footballer
 Norman Ligairi (born 1976), a Fijian rugby union player
 Norman Parke (born 1986) Northern Ireland born MMA fighter known as "Stormin' Norman Parke." 
 Norman Powell (born 1993) American professional basketball player 

Nicknames